Derek Christopher (DC) Curry (born in Houston, Texas) is a former American football linebacker. He was a nationally recruited high school football and baseball player.  He entered the National Football League by signing to the Miami Dolphins and then the Cincinnati Bengals.  He played college football at Notre Dame where he was a Team Captain and an honorable mention All-American middle linebacker. In 2004 he had 65 tackles. He graduated from Notre Dame with a degree in Management Information System and Theology.

He is currently running a liquid waste company based out of Nashville.

He was formerly a Manager in Operations at Waste Management.  Before that he was on the Executive Team at ROAR and UPROAR.  He also holds seats as a board member at two startup companies in San Francisco and Chicago.

Curry was formerly a Senior Leader and Pastor of Next Gen and Families at Granger Community Church in Granger, Indiana where he oversaw the 6th-12th grade ministry. He is married to Brooke Wilkins, a graduate of Saint Mary's College. They have two children Jada and Janelle.

References

External links
 Derek Curry's Blog
 Notre Dame's player page 
 Notre Dame article

1981 births
Living people
American football linebackers
Notre Dame Fighting Irish football players
Cincinnati Bengals players
Players of American football from Houston